Down Texas Way is a 1942 American Western film directed by Howard Bretherton and written by Adele Buffington. This is the sixth film in Monogram Pictures' Rough Riders series, and stars Buck Jones as Marshal Buck Roberts, Tim McCoy as Marshal Tim McCall and Raymond Hatton as Marshal Sandy Hopkins, with Luana Walters, Dave O'Brien and Lois Austin. The film was released on May 22, 1942, by Monogram Pictures. It was the sixth of the studio's Rough Riders film series.

Plot

Cast         
 Buck Jones as Buck Roberts
 Tim McCoy as Tim McCall
 Raymond Hatton as Sandy Hopkins
 Luana Walters as Mary Hopkins
 Dave O'Brien as Dave Dodge
 Lois Austin as Stella
 Glenn Strange as Sheriff Trump
 Harry Woods as Bert Logan
 Tom London as Pete
 John Merton as Steve
 Silver as Silver

See also
The Rough Riders series:
 Arizona Bound
 The Gunman from Bodie
 Forbidden Trails
 Below the Border
 Ghost Town Law
 Down Texas Way
 Riders of the West
 West of the Law

References

External links
 

1942 films
American Western (genre) films
1942 Western (genre) films
Monogram Pictures films
Films directed by Howard Bretherton
American black-and-white films
1940s English-language films
1940s American films